The Roman Catholic Diocese of Apucarana is a diocese located in the city of Apucarana in the Ecclesiastical province of Londrina in Brazil.

History
 November 28, 1964: Established as Diocese of Apucarana from the Diocese of Campo Mourão and Diocese of Londrina

Bishops
 Bishops of Apucarana (Latin Rite)
 Romeu Alberti (1965.02.22 – 1982.06.03), appointed Archbishop of Ribeirão Preto, São Paulo, Brazil
 Domingos Gabriel Wisniewski, C.M. (1983.05.17 – 2005.02.02)
 Luiz Vicente Bernetti, O.A.D. (2005.02.02 – 2009.07.08)
 Celso Antonio Marchiori (2009.07.08 - 2017.12.13), appointed Bishop of São José dos Pinhais, Parana
 Carlos José de Oliveira (12.12.2018–present)

Other priests of this diocese who became bishops
João Braz de Aviz, appointed Auxiliary Bishop of Vitória, Espirito Santo in 1994; future Cardinal
Dirceu Vegini, appointed Auxiliary Bishop of Curitiba, Parana in 2006

References
 GCatholic.org
 Catholic Hierarchy

Roman Catholic dioceses in Brazil
Christian organizations established in 1964
Apucarana, Roman Catholic Diocese of
Roman Catholic dioceses and prelatures established in the 20th century
Apucarana